Canton of Beaupréau-en-Mauges (before March 2020: canton of Beaupréau) is a canton of France, located in the Maine-et-Loire department, in the Pays de la Loire region. At the French canton reorganisation which came into effect in March 2015, the canton was expanded from 12 to 22 communes (21 of which merged into the new communes of Beaupréau-en-Mauges and Montrevault-sur-Èvre in December 2015):
Beaupréau-en-Mauges
Bégrolles-en-Mauges
Montrevault-sur-Èvre

See also 
 Arrondissement of Cholet
 Cantons of the Maine-et-Loire department
 Communes of the Maine-et-Loire department

References

External links
  canton of Beaupréau on the web of the General Council of Maine-et-Loire

Cantons of Maine-et-Loire